Tapeshwari Sharma is an Indian television actress born in Odisha, India. She started her career with her first show Kasauti Zindagi Ki in 2007, When she was doing management course in NMIMS, Mumbai (2007) After that she got a parallel lead role in a show called Jiya Jale as Sujata Kotak on 9X (TV channel) with Sriti Jha (2007). after that she worked in various Hindi daily soaps. But she is mostly famous for the show Sasural Genda Phool Sanjana Bajpai, Suhana's sister, Kamal Kishore's youngest daughter, Deepak's wife (in the last episode) (2010–12).

Filmography

Awards

References

External links 
 
 

Indian soap opera actresses
Year of birth missing (living people)
Living people